Harold Neal (3 July 1897 – 24 August 1972) was a British Labour Party politician.  He was Member of Parliament (MP) for Clay Cross from a 1944 by-election to 1950, and after boundary changes, for Bolsover from 1950 until his retirement in 1970, preceding Dennis Skinner.  Neal was Parliamentary Secretary to the Minister of Fuel and Power, Philip Noel-Baker, in 1951.

References

External links 
 

1897 births
1972 deaths
Labour Party (UK) MPs for English constituencies
Members of the Parliament of the United Kingdom for constituencies in Derbyshire
Miners' Federation of Great Britain-sponsored MPs
Ministers in the Attlee governments, 1945–1951
National Union of Mineworkers-sponsored MPs
UK MPs 1935–1945
UK MPs 1945–1950
UK MPs 1950–1951
UK MPs 1951–1955
UK MPs 1955–1959
UK MPs 1959–1964
UK MPs 1964–1966
UK MPs 1966–1970